Transferrin receptor protein 1 (TfR1), also known as Cluster of Differentiation 71 (CD71), is a protein that in humans is encoded by the TFRC gene. TfR1 is required for iron import from transferrin into cells by endocytosis.

Structure and function

TfR1 is a transmembrane glycoprotein composed of two disulfide-linked monomers joined by two disulfide bonds. Each monomer binds one holo-transferrin molecule creating an iron-Tf-TfR complex which enters the cell by endocytosis.

Clinical significance 
TfR1 as a potential new target in cases of human leukemia & lymphoma. InatherYs, in Évry, France, developed a candidate drug, INA01 antibody (anti-CD71) that showed efficacy in pre-clinical studies in the therapy of two incurable orphan oncohematological diseases: the adult T cell leukemia (ATLL) caused by HTLV-1 and the Mantle cell lymphoma (MCL).

TfR1 expressed on the endothelial cells of the blood-brain barrier is used also in preclinical research to allow the delivery of large molecules including antibodies into the brain. Some of the TfR1 targeting antibodies have been shown to cross the blood-brain barrier, without interfering with the uptake of iron. Amongst those are the mouse anti rat-TfR antibody OX26 and the rat anti mouse-TfR antibody 8D3. The affinity of the antibody-TfR interaction seems to be important determining the success of transcytotic transport over endothelial cells of the BBB. Monovalent TfR interaction favors BBB transport due to altered intracellular sorting pathways. Avidity effects of bivalent interactions redirecting transport to the lysosome. Also, reducing TfR binding affinity directly promote dissociation from the TfR which increase brain parenchymal exposure of the TfR binding antibody.

Interactions 

TfR1 has been shown to interact with GABARAP and HFE.

Immunostain marker
CD71 is a robust immunohistochemistry marker for chorionic villi, especially in necrotic specimens. Among white blood cells and precursors, CD71 is expressed only by erythroid precursors within the normal hematopoietic marrow and spleen, in contrast to glycophorin that marks all types of red blood cells.

See also 
 Transferrin receptor 2
 Cluster of differentiation

References

External links 
 

Iron metabolism
Clusters of differentiation
Transferrins